Jame Pollock (born June 16, 1979) is a Canadian former professional ice hockey defenceman. Pollock was born in Quebec City, Quebec, but grew up in Victoria, British Columbia.

Playing career
Pollock was drafted in the fourth round, 106th overall, in the 1997 NHL Entry Draft by the St. Louis Blues. After playing four seasons in the Western Hockey League for the Seattle Thunderbirds, Pollock joined the Blues' American Hockey League affiliate, the Worcester IceCats.

He spent five seasons with the IceCats, and debuted in the National Hockey League with the Blues during the 2003–04 season. Pollock appeared in nine games with the Blues, recording no points. Pollock was an All Star defenceman on Canada's winning Spengler Cup team in 2003.
 
During the 2004–05 NHL lockout, Pollock went to Switzerland's Nationalliga A and played for the Kloten Flyers and HC Lugano. He remained in Europe for the 2005–06 season, joining the DEL's Nürnberg Ice Tigers where he played for two seasons leading Nurnberg to the DEL Finals in 2007. During that season, he set a record for the most goals in a season by a defenceman and played for Canada as they won the World Cup.

On July 5, 2007, Pollock was signed by the Washington Capitals to a two-way deal but left the Capitals minor league team, the Hershey Bears, in December 2007 to play with CSKA Moscow in the Russian Superleague. In the inaugural season of the Kontinental Hockey League, Pollock returned to Russia and played with HC MVD in the 2008–09 season.

On April 6, 2009, he transferred from MVD to the Deutsche Eishockey Liga with top club Adler Mannheim. After two seasons with Mannheim, Pollock returned to his original German club Nürnberg Ice Tigers, signing a one-year contract on June 6, 2011.

Career statistics

References

External links

1979 births
Living people
Adler Mannheim players
Anglophone Quebec people
Canadian expatriate ice hockey players in Germany
Canadian expatriate ice hockey players in Russia
Canadian ice hockey defencemen
HC CSKA Moscow players
HC Lugano players
HC MVD players
Hershey Bears players
Ice hockey people from British Columbia
Ice hockey people from Quebec City
EHC Kloten players
St. Louis Blues draft picks
St. Louis Blues players
Seattle Thunderbirds players
Sinupret Ice Tigers players
Sportspeople from Victoria, British Columbia
Thomas Sabo Ice Tigers players
Worcester IceCats players